The 2019 Summit League men's soccer tournament, was the 26th edition of the tournament. It determined the Summit League's automatic berth into the 2019 NCAA Division I men's soccer tournament.

The defending champions, Denver, won the title, beating Omaha 1-0 in the final.

Seeds

Bracket

Results

Semifinals

Final

All Tournament Team

References

External links 
 2019 Summit League Men's Soccer Tournament 

Summit League Men's Soccer Tournament
Summit League Men's Soccer
Summit Men's Soccer Tournament